Thorney railway station was a station in Thorney, Cambridgeshire on the Midland and Great Northern Joint Railway line between Peterborough and Wisbech.

References

Disused railway stations in Cambridgeshire
Former Midland and Great Northern Joint Railway stations
Railway stations in Great Britain opened in 1866
Railway stations in Great Britain closed in 1957
Transport in Peterborough
Buildings and structures in Peterborough
1866 establishments in England